Anania cuspidata is a moth in the family Crambidae. It was described by Zhang, Li and Wang in 2002. It is found in China (Gansu).

References

Moths described in 2002
Pyraustinae
Moths of Asia